James or Jim Elkins may refer to:

 Jim Elkins (criminal) (1901–1968), crime boss in Portland, Oregon
 James Elkins (art historian) (born 1955), art critic and art historian based in Chicago
 James A. Elkins (1879–1972), lawyer and banker in Houston, Texas